There are three suffixed routes of Saskatchewan Highway 16 in the Canadian province of Saskatchewan:

Highway 16A

Yorkton

The Yorkton segment of Highway 16A is about 5 km (3 mi.) long. It runs concurrently with Highway 10A along Broadway Street before it leaves the concurrency at Gladstone Avenue N. and travels north to York Road.

Major intersections
From northwest to southeast:

The Battlefords

It existed until  when the Battlefords Bridge was twinned along the Highway 4 / Highway 16 / Highway 40 corridor. The original Battlefords Bridge via Finlayson Island was closed to vehicular traffic (it remained open to bicycles and pedestrians) and Highway 16A was decommissioned.

Major intersections
From west to east:

Highway 16B

Highway 16B is a highway in the Canadian province of Saskatchewan. It runs from Highway 16/Highway 40 at North Battleford until Highway 16/Highway 4/Highway 40, also at North Battleford. Highway 16B is about 4 km (2 mi.) long, making it one of the shortest provincial-grade highways in the province.

Major intersections
From east to west:

References

016A
North Battleford
Transport in Yorkton